Paul Kamlesh Pattni (also known as Brother Paul) (born 1965) is a Kenyan businessman and pastor. He was implicated in the 1990s Goldenberg scandal but was acquitted in 2013.

Background
Kamlesh Pattni was born and raised in Mombasa, Kenya. He later moved to practice business in Nairobi, where he allegedly used his company to acquire billions of shillings, in league with prominent politicians and government officials in the Goldenberg scandal.

The Daily Nation reports that Kamlesh Pattni is now a baptised Christian taking the name of Paul, and runs his own church.

In April 2013, the High Court acquitted him over the Goldenberg scandal.

Political career
Pattni is the chairman of the Kenya National Democratic Alliance (KENDA), a political party in Kenya. He was a parliamentary candidate at the 2007  elections. He unsuccessfully contested the Westlands Constituency in the 2013 election and received 10,083 votes.

Personal life
He was born into a Hindu family and later converted to Christianity and took the name Paul on his baptism.

In 2012, he was awarded the Lifetime Africa Achievement Prize for Humanitarianism and Equity by the Ghanaian Excellence Awards Foundation.

References

External links 

  
 Probe into Kenya hotel sell-off BBC

1965 births
Living people
Kenyan businesspeople